The Mad River (Shawnee: Hathennithiipi ) is a stream located in the west central part of the U.S. state of Ohio.  It flows  from Logan County to downtown Dayton, where it meets the Great Miami River. The stream flows southwest from its source near Campbell Hill through West Liberty, along U.S. Route 68 west of Urbana, past Springfield (the point of confluence with Buck Creek), then along Ohio State Route 4 into Dayton. The stream's confluence with the Great Miami River is in Deeds Park.

The Mad River was one of the Great Miami River tributaries that flooded during the Great Dayton Flood of 1913, resulting in the creation of the Miami Conservancy District.

The river derives its name from its mad, broken and rapid current. Historically, the stream has also been known by the names Mad Creek and Tiber River, respectively, as well as by the Croatian name Fiume Mad (lit. "Mad River").

The first road between Cincinnati and Dayton that opened up the "Mad River Country" to European settlement was the Mad River Road, cut in 1797. Today, a ski resort named Mad River Mountain is located near the stream's source.

Mad River is the largest coldwater fishery in Ohio. The Ohio Department of Natural Resources's Division of Wildlife periodically stocks Mad River with rainbow trout and brown trout. The trout population suffers low reproduction rates due to sedimentation from channelization, extensive agricultural runoff, and diminishing habitat.

See also
List of rivers of Ohio
Fishing in Ohio
Water pollution

References 

Rivers of Ohio
Rivers of Champaign County, Ohio
Rivers of Clark County, Ohio
Rivers of Greene County, Ohio
Rivers of Logan County, Ohio
Rivers of Montgomery County, Ohio